Carlo Maranta (1583 – 26 January 1664) was a Roman Catholic prelate who served as Bishop of Tropea (1657–1664) 
and Bishop of Giovinazzo (1637–1657).

Biography
Carlo Maranta was born in Naples, Italy in 1583.
On 7 September 1637, he was appointed during the papacy of Pope Urban VIII as Bishop of Giovinazzo.
On 20 September 1637, he was consecrated bishop by Francesco Maria Brancaccio, Cardinal-Priest of Santi XII Apostoli, with Gaetano Cossa, Archbishop of Otranto, and Tommaso Carafa, Bishop Emeritus of Vulturara e Montecorvin, serving as co-consecrators.
On 24 March 1657, he was selected as Bishop of Tropea and confirmed by Pope Alexander VII on 24 September 1657.
He served as Bishop of Tropea until his death on 26 January 1664.

References

External links and additional sources
 (for Chronology of Bishops) 
 (for Chronology of Bishops) 
 (for Chronology of Bishops) 
 (for Chronology of Bishops) 

17th-century Italian Roman Catholic bishops
Bishops appointed by Pope Urban VIII
Bishops appointed by Pope Alexander VII
1583 births
1664 deaths